Ornithinimicrobium murale is a Gram-positive and non-spore-forming bacterium species from the genus Ornithinimicrobium which has been isolated from an indoor wall from Giessen in Germany.

References 

 

Actinomycetia
Bacteria described in 2013